= Get Up and Go (The Go-Go's song) =

Getup and Go is a Song by The Go-Go's
